The 1998 Thai Premier League consisted of 12 teams. The bottom club would be relegated to the Thailand Division 1 League. The club that came 11th would play in a relegation / promotion match against the club that came second in the Thailand Division 1 League

Defending Champions Royal Thai Air Force should have entered the next edition of the Asian Club Championship, but refused due to lack of funding. BEC Tero Sasana took their place.

The league was also known as the Caltex Premier League.

Member clubs locations
Bangkok Bank
BEC Tero Sasana (Tero Sasana)
Sinthana
Krung Thai Bank (promoted from Division 1)
Osotsapa M-150 (promoted from Division 1)
Port Authority of Thailand
UCOM Raj Pracha
Bangkok Metropolitan Administration
Royal Thai Air Force
Royal Thai Army
Thai Farmers Bank
TOT

Final league table

Promotion and relegation Playoff 

The club that came 11th would play in a relegation / promotion match against the runner-up in the Thailand Division 1 League.

January 24 and January 31, 1998

† Bangkok Metropolitan Administration remain at the Thai Premier League.

Season notes 
 The bottom club would be relegated, with the team coming 11th, to play in a relegation / promotion matchup against the 2nd placed team in Thailand Division 1 League.
 UCOM Raj Pracha were relegated and replaced by 2nd level winners Bangkok Bank of Commerce.
 Bangkok Metropolitan Administration  overcame Assumption Sriracha in the playoff match.
 Tero Sasana changed the club's name again to BEC Tero Sasana with the main sponsor, Thailand’s Entertainment giant "BEC Tero Entertainment."

Queens Cup

The Singha sponsored Queen's Cup was postponed because of lack of sponsorship, will be held next year but with reduced prize money.

Thailand FA Cup

Bangkok Bank won the 1998 Thailand FA Cup, and their 3rd victory in this competition. It is unclear whom they beat in the final

Yamaha Thailand Cup

1998 saw the 14th edition of the Yamaha Thailand Cup.

It was Thailand's main inter-provincial competition, played between qualifiers from various regions.

The first round saw four groups of four teams, of which the top two sides qualified for the Quarter-Final knockout stage.

Bangkok Metropolitan Administration beat Nakhon Si Thammarat in the final.

Asian Representation

 BEC Tero Sasana represented Thailand in the 1998–99 Asian Club Championship, where they would reach the second round, beaten by Chinese opposition in Dalian Wanda, the same club who ended Bangkok Bank's adventure the previous year.
 Sinthana made the second round of the 1998–99 Asian Cup Winners Cup, where they were out classed by Japanese opposition in Kashima Antlers.

Annual awards

Coach of the Year 
 Karoon Narksawat - Sinthana

Player of the Year 
 Niweat Siriwong - Sinthana

Top scorer 
 Ronnachai Sayomchai - 23 Goals Port Authority of Thailand

Champions
The champion for the 1998 season was Sinthana. It was the team's first title.

References

Thailand 1998 RSSSF

External links
Official website

Thai League 1 seasons
Thailand
Thailand
1